Awakening Music (previously known as Awakening Records) is a British-based Islamic faith-inspired music production company. It was created in 2000 by four British and American entrepreneurs.

Albums produced by Awakening Music 

Live albums

Artists 
 Ali Magrebi
 Eman
 Humood AlKhudher
 Maher Zain
 Mesut Kurtis
 Raef

Former notable artists 
 Hamza Namira
 Hamza Robertson
 Irfan Makki
 Nazeel Azami
 Sami Yusuf

Philanthropy activities 
In 2012, Awakening Music took part in "Sound of Light" charity concerts. In 2013 and 2014, the record label helped to organise charity concerts in coordination with Islamic Relief, Human Appeal and other charity organisations around the world with the help of artists Maher Zain, Hamza Namira, Mesut Kurtis, Raef and Irfan Makki.

References

External links 

Record labels established in 2003
2003 establishments in the United Kingdom
English record labels
British independent record labels
 
Islamic music
Islamic record labels